There are about 300 known moth species of the Gambia. The moths (mostly nocturnal) and butterflies (mostly diurnal) together make up the taxonomic order Lepidoptera.

This is a list of moth species which have been recorded in the Gambia.

Arctiidae
Acantharctia mundata (Walker, 1865)
Acanthofrontia atricosta Hampson, 1918
Aloa moloneyi (Druce, 1887)
Alpenus maculosa (Stoll, 1781)
Amata tomasina (Butler, 1876)
Amerila fennia (Druce, 1887)
Argina amanda (Boisduval, 1847)
Argina leonina (Walker, 1865)
Binna scita (Walker, 1865)
Creatonotos leucanioides Holland, 1893
Cyana rejecta (Walker, 1854)
Estigmene unilinea Rothschild, 1910
Euchromia guineensis (Fabricius, 1775)
Euchromia lethe (Fabricius, 1775)
Logunovium nigricosta (Holland, 1893)
Madagascarctia madagascariensis (Butler, 1882)
Oedaleosia nigricosta Hampson, 1900
Poliosia albida Hampson, 1914
Pseudothyretes perpusilla (Walker, 1856)
Spilosoma crossi (Rothschild, 1910)
Spilosoma curvilinea Walker, 1855
Spilosoma rava (Druce, 1898)
Thyretes caffra Wallengren, 1863
Trichaeta bivittata (Walker, 1864)
Utetheisa pulchella (Linnaeus, 1758)

Autostichidae
Procometis acutipennis (Walsingham, 1891)

Bombycidae
Racinoa ianthe (Druce, 1887)

Brachodidae
Nigilgia albitogata (Walsingham, 1891)

Coleophoridae
Holcocera irroratella (Walsingham, 1891)
Licmocera lyonetiella Walsingham, 1891

Cosmopterigidae
Alloclita gambiella (Walsingham, 1891)
Anatrachyntis simplex (Walsingham, 1891)
Cnemidolophus lavernellus Walsingham, 1881
Macrobathra distincta (Walsingham, 1891)
Macrobathra fasciata (Walsingham, 1891)

Cossidae
Macrocossus toluminus (Druce, 1887)

Crambidae
Bocchoris inspersalis (Zeller, 1852)
Cadarena sinuata (Fabricius, 1781)
Calamotropha discellus (Walker, 1863)
Charltona albimixtalis Hampson, 1919
Cnaphalocrocis trapezalis (Guenée, 1854)
Conotalis aurantifascia (Hampson, 1895)
Diaphana indica (Saunders, 1851)
Dysallacta negatalis (Walker, 1859)
Glyphodes stolalis Guenée, 1854
Haimbachia proalbivenalis (Błeszyński, 1961)
Haritalodes derogata (Fabricius, 1775)
Herpetogramma phaeopteralis (Guenée, 1854)
Nausinoe geometralis (Guenée, 1854)
Nomophila noctuella ([Denis & Schiffermüller], 1775)
Notarcha cassualis (Walker, 1859)
Palpita claralis (Walker, 1865)
Palpita elealis (Walker, 1859)
Palpita unionalis (Hübner, 1796)
Pleuroptya aegrotalis (Zeller, 1852)
Sceliodes laisalis (Walker, 1859)
Spoladea recurvalis (Fabricius, 1775)
Stemorrhages sericea (Drury, 1773)
Syllepte ovialis (Walker, 1859)
Syllepte sarronalis (Walker, 1859)
Zebronia phenice (Cramer, 1780)

Drepanidae
Negera confusa Walker, 1855
Negera natalensis (Felder, 1874)

Elachistidae
Ptilobola inornatella (Walsingham, 1891)
Stenoma complanella (Walsingham, 1891)

Eupterotidae
Jana tantalus Herrich-Schäffer, 1854
Phiala costipuncta (Herrich-Schäffer, 1855)
Vianga tristis Druce, 1896

Gelechiidae
Anarsia agricola Walsingham, 1891
Anarsia inculta Walsingham, 1891
Brachmia septella (Zeller, 1852)
Dactylethrella bryophilella (Walsingham, 1891)
Dichomeris marginata (Walsingham, 1891)
Dichomeris marmoratus (Walsingham, 1891)
Onebala zulu (Walsingham, 1881)
Polyhymno cleodorella Walsingham, 1891
Prasodryas fracticostella (Walsingham, 1891)
Thiotricha tenuis (Walsingham, 1891)
Tricyanaula metallica (Walsingham, 1891)

Geometridae
Aphilopota otoessa Prout, 1954
Chiasmia amarata (Guenée, 1858)
Chiasmia angolaria (Snellen, 1872)
Chiasmia rectistriaria (Herrich-Schäffer, 1854)
Chiasmia semitecta (Walker, 1861)
Comibaena leucospilata (Walker, 1863)
Comostolopsis stillata (Felder & Rogenhofer, 1875)
Erastria leucicolor (Butler, 1875)
Melinoessa fulvata (Drury, 1773)
Neromia enotes Prout, 1917
Orbamia octomaculata (Wallengren, 1872)
Orbamia renimacula (Prout, 1926)
Pingasa lahayei (Oberthür, 1887)
Pingasa rhadamaria (Guenée, 1858)
Scopula internata (Guenée, 1857)
Scopula lactaria (Walker, 1861)
Scopula latitans Prout, 1920
Victoria perornata Warren, 1898
Zamarada clavigera D. S. Fletcher, 1974
Zamarada dilucida Warren, 1909
Zamarada nasuta Warren, 1897
Zamarada phrontisaria Swinhoe, 1904

Gracillariidae
Acrocercops bifasciata (Walsingham, 1891)
Lamprolectica apicistrigata (Walsingham, 1891)

Lasiocampidae
Leipoxais directa (Walker, 1865)
Pachytrina honrathii (Dewitz, 1881)
Philotherma unicolor (Walker, 1855)

Lecithoceridae
Odites carterella Walsingham, 1891
Odites inconspicua Walsingham, 1891
Protolychnis marginata (Walsingham, 1891)
Timyra extranea Walsingham, 1891

Lymantriidae
Aroa discalis Walker, 1855
Crorema mentiens Walker, 1855
Dasychira pytna (Druce, 1898)
Dasychira remota Druce, 1887
Euproctis crocata (Boisduval, 1847)
Euproctis producta (Walker, 1863)
Euproctis pygmaea (Walker, 1855)
Euproctoides acrisia Plötz, 1880
Laelia subrosea (Walker, 1855)
Naroma varipes (Walker, 1865)
Polymona rufifemur Walker, 1855

Lyonetiidae
Micropostega aeneofasciata Walsingham, 1891

Metarbelidae
Kroonia carteri Lehmann, 2010

Nepticulidae
Stigmella birgittae Gustafsson, 1985
Stigmella zizyphi (Walsingham, 1911)

Noctuidae
Acanthodelta janata (Linnaeus, 1758)
Achaea albicilia (Walker, 1858)
Achaea ezea (Cramer, 1779)
Achaea illustrata Walker, 1858
Achaea mormoides Walker, 1858
Acontia basifera Walker, 1857
Acontia citrelinea Bethune-Baker, 1911
Acontia imitatrix Wallengren, 1856
Acontia insocia (Walker, 1857)
Acontia transfigurata Wallengren, 1856
Acontia wahlbergi Wallengren, 1856
Aegocera rectilinea Boisduval, 1836
Agrotis biconica Kollar, 1844
Amyna axis Guenée, 1852
Anoba remota (Druce, 1887)
Anticarsia rubricans (Boisduval, 1833)
Asota speciosa (Drury, 1773)
Aspidifrontia hemileuca (Hampson, 1909)
Audea paulumnodosa Kühne, 2005
Bareia incidens Walker, 1858
Brithys crini (Fabricius, 1775)
Chrysodeixis acuta (Walker, [1858])
Crameria amabilis (Drury, 1773)
Cyligramma fluctuosa (Drury, 1773)
Cyligramma latona (Cramer, 1775)
Cyligramma limacina (Guérin-Méneville, 1832)
Dysgonia arcifera (Druce, 1912)
Dysgonia torrida (Guenée, 1852)
Entomogramma mediocris Walker, 1865
Erebus walkeri (Butler, 1875)
Ericeia congregata (Walker, 1858)
Ericeia sobria Walker, 1858
Eudocima materna (Linnaeus, 1767)
Eulocastra monozona Hampson, 1910
Eutelia callichroma (Distant, 1901)
Eutelia violescens (Hampson, 1912)
Godasa sidae (Fabricius, 1793)
Grammodes geometrica (Fabricius, 1775)
Grammodes stolida (Fabricius, 1775)
Helicoverpa assulta (Guenée, 1852)
Heliophisma klugii (Boisduval, 1833)
Herpeperas rudis (Walker, 1865)
Hypena jussalis Walker, 1859
Hypena obacerralis Walker, [1859]
Hypopyra capensis Herrich-Schäffer, 1854
Janseodes melanospila (Guenée, 1852)
Leucania insulicola Guenée, 1852
Leucania loreyi (Duponchel, 1827)
Masalia albiseriata (Druce, 1903)
Masalia decorata (Moore, 1881)
Masalia galatheae (Wallengren, 1856)
Masalia nubila (Hampson, 1903)
Masalia terracottoides (Rothschild, 1921)
Mentaxya rimosa (Guenée, 1852)
Miniodes discolor Guenée, 1852
Misa memnonia Karsch, 1895
Mitrophrys magna (Walker, 1854)
Mitrophrys menete (Cramer, 1775)
Mocis mayeri (Boisduval, 1833)
Ophiusa subdiversa (L. B. Prout, 1919)
Ophiusa tirhaca (Cramer, 1777)
Oraesia emarginata (Fabricius, 1794)
Pandesma quenavadi Guenée, 1852
Plecoptera reversa (Walker, 1865)
Polydesma umbricola Boisduval, 1833
Polytelodes florifera (Walker, 1858)
Rhabdophera clathrum (Guenée, 1852)
Rhynchina leucodonta Hampson, 1910
Rhynchina tinctalis (Zeller, 1852)
Serrodes nigha Guenée, 1852
Sphingomorpha chlorea (Cramer, 1777)
Spodoptera cilium Guenée, 1852
Spodoptera exempta (Walker, 1857)
Spodoptera littoralis (Boisduval, 1833)
Spodoptera mauritia (Boisduval, 1833)
Trichoplusia ni (Hübner, [1803])
Trigonodes hyppasia (Cramer, 1779)

Nolidae
Characoma ferrigrisea (Hampson, 1905)
Leocyma camilla (Druce, 1887)
Lophocrama phoenicochlora Hampson, 1912
Neaxestis mesogonia (Hampson, 1905)
Negeta luminosa (Walker, 1858)
Neonegeta zelia (Druce, 1887)
Pardoxia graellsii (Feisthamel, 1837)
Selepa leucogonia (Hampson, 1905)
Selepa violascens Hampson, 1912

Notodontidae
Anaphe panda (Boisduval, 1847)
Antheua simplex Walker, 1855
Desmeocraera latex (Druce, 1901)
Epanaphe carteri (Walsingham, 1885)
Epanaphe moloneyi (Druce, 1887)
Tricholoba carteri (Druce, 1887)

Oecophoridae
Stathmopoda auriferella (Walker, 1864)
Stathmopoda crassella Walsingham, 1891
Stathmopoda maculata Walsingham, 1891

Plutellidae
Plutella xylostella (Linnaeus, 1758)

Psychidae
Eumeta cervina Druce, 1887

Pterophoridae
Hepalastis pumilio (Zeller, 1873)
Megalorhipida leucodactylus (Fabricius, 1794)
Pterophorus albidus (Zeller, 1852)
Sphenarches anisodactylus (Walker, 1864)
Trichoptilus vivax Meyrick, 1909

Pyralidae
Ditrachyptera verruciferella (Ragonot, 1888)
Endotricha vinolentalis Ragonot, 1891
Etiella zinckenella (Treitschke, 1832)
Faveria dionysia (Zeller, 1846)
Pempelia interniplagella (Ragonot, 1888)

Saturniidae
Cirina forda (Westwood, 1849)
Epiphora bauhiniae (Guérin-Méneville, 1832)
Imbrasia obscura (Butler, 1878)
Ludia orinoptena Karsch, 1892
Tagoropsis flavinata (Walker, 1865)

Sphingidae
Acherontia atropos (Linnaeus, 1758)
Agrius convolvuli (Linnaeus, 1758)
Basiothia medea (Fabricius, 1781)
Cephonodes hylas (Linnaeus, 1771)
Coelonia solani (Boisduval, 1833)
Daphnis nerii (Linnaeus, 1758)
Hippotion balsaminae (Walker, 1856)
Hippotion celerio (Linnaeus, 1758)
Hippotion eson (Cramer, 1779)
Hippotion osiris (Dalman, 1823)
Leucostrophus alterhirundo d'Abrera, 1987
Lophostethus dumolinii (Angas, 1849)
Nephele accentifera (Palisot de Beauvois, 1821)
Nephele aequivalens (Walker, 1856)
Nephele comma Hopffer, 1857
Nephele funebris (Fabricius, 1793)
Nephele peneus (Cramer, 1776)
Nephele rosae Butler, 1875
Pseudoclanis postica (Walker, 1856)
Rufoclanis rosea (Druce, 1882)
Temnora livida (Holland, 1889)
Temnora scitula (Holland, 1889)

Tineidae
Autochthonus chalybiellus Walsingham, 1891
Dasyses rugosella (Stainton, 1859)
Monopis monachella (Hübner, 1796)
Oxymachaeris niveocervina Walsingham, 1891
Phereoeca praecox Gozmány & Vári, 1973
Phereoeca proletaria (Meyrick, 1921)
Sphallestasis creagra (Gozmány, 1968)
Sphallestasis cristata (Gozmány, 1967)
Tinea atomosella Walker, 1863
Tinea taedia Gozmány, 1968
Tinea translucens Meyrick, 1917
Trichophaga mormopis Meyrick, 1935

Tortricidae
Ancylis falcata (Walsingham, 1891)
Ancylis oculifera (Walsingham, 1891)
Bactra bactrana (Kennel, 1901)
Bactra endea Diakonoff, 1963
Choristoneura occidentalis (Walsingham, 1891)
Dichrorampha excisa Walsingham, 1891
Eccopsis incultana (Walker, 1863)
Eccopsis nebulana Walsingham, 1891
Eccopsis wahlbergiana Zeller, 1852
Grapholita dimidiata (Walsingham, 1891)
Panegyra flavicostana (Walsingham, 1891)
Paraeccopsis insellata (Meyrick, 1920)
Phaecasiophora basicornis Walsingham, 1891
Phaecasiophora variabilis Walsingham, 1891
Pseudeboda gambiae Razowski, 1964
Sanguinograptis albardana (Snellen, 1872)
Syricoris apicipunctana (Walsingham, 1891)

Uraniidae
Dissoprumna erycinaria (Guenée, 1857)

Xyloryctidae
Eretmocera basistrigata Walsingham, 1889
Eretmocera carteri Walsingham, 1889
Eretmocera fuscipennis Zeller, 1852
Eretmocera laetissima Zeller, 1852
Eretmocera scatospila Zeller, 1852
Scythris pangalactis Meyrick, 1933
Scythris subeburnea (Walsingham, 1891)

Yponomeutidae
Atteva carteri (Walsingham, 1891)

External links

Moths
Moths
Gambia
Gambia
Moths